Lieutenant General of New France was the military post that governed early New France (including the early colonies in Acadia and Quebec) from 1598 until 1627. Before 1598, the office was briefly occupied from 1541 to 1543.  The office was replaced by the title of Governor of New France in 1627. It was the first vice-regal post in what would later become Canada, and is a precursor of the present-day office of Governor General of Canada, the representative of King Charles III, Canada's King and Head of State.

Most of the Lieutenant Generals never set foot on New France, except Pierre Dugua, Sieur de Mons and Jean-François Roberval, and served the office from France. This office was succeeded by the Governor of New France.

References

Governors of New France
New France
New France
New France
1541 establishments in New France
1627 disestablishments in New France